Georges Debunne (2 May 1918 – 21 September 2008) was a Belgian trade union leader.

Born in Menen, Debunne qualified as a teacher, and worked in Halle, joining the trade union.  After World War II, he was elected as full-time secretary of the civil engineering section of the General Union of Public Services, then as national secretary of its civil service section.  In 1956, he was elected as president of the union.  In 1968, he was elected as general secretary of the General Federation of Belgian Labour, and also as a vice-president of the International Confederation of Free Trade Unions.  In 1983, he was elected as president of the European Trade Union Confederation (ETUC).  He retired in 1985, becoming secretary of the ETUC's Federation of Retired and Elderly People.

In 2005, Debunne was a founder of the small Committee for Another Policy political party.

References

1918 births
2008 deaths
Belgian trade unionists
People from Menen